The 1976 National Professional Soccer League was the sixth season of the National Professional Soccer League, a South African soccer league. It was won by Orlando Pirates.

At the time, due to the country's apartheid policies, the competition was only open to black South African teams, and it ran in parallel with the FPL and the NFL. 

1976
1976 in South African sport
1975–76 in African association football leagues